The Fugazi Bank Building, also known as the Fugazi Banca Popolare Operaia Italiana Building, and Old Transamerica Building, is a historic commercial building built in 1909, and located at 4 Columbus Avenue in the Jackson Square Historic District of San Francisco, California. 

The Fugazi Bank Building has been listed as a San Francisco Designated Landmark since March 5, 1973; and is part of the Jackson Square Historic District which was added to the National Register of Historic Places in 1971.

History 
The Fugazi Bank Building was designed by architect Charles Peter Paff (1865–1942) and was originally flat-iron-shaped and standing at two stories with a cupola at its sharp point, but the cupola was removed and a third story was later added. The building has a white terra cotta-cladding. 

The Fugazi Bank Building was a design reference-point for the Reid & Reids' Colombo Building (1913; also known as the Drexler-Colombo Building) located nearby at 1 Columbus Avenue, with a mirroring building shape. These two buildings together are framing the gateway to Columbus Avenue and the North Beach neighborhood.

Giovanni "John" Fugazi (1838–1916) originally built the structure in 1909 to hold the Banca Popolare Operaia Italiana Popular Italiana Bank. A.P. Giannini had been a member of the Fugazi Bank's board of directors early in his career and before founding the Bank of Italy; and later he purchased the building which served as the headquarters of his Transamerica Corporation (founded in 1928). Since November 2003, the building has been owned by the Church of Scientology.

See also 
 Italian American Bank
 List of San Francisco Designated Landmarks

References 

San Francisco Designated Landmarks
Buildings and structures completed in 1909
1909 establishments in California
Neoclassical architecture in California
Former bank buildings